Road Agent is a 1952 American Western film directed by Lesley Selander and starring Tim Holt and Richard Martin.

Principal supporting cast members included Noreen Nash and Mauritz Hugo.

Plot

Cast
 Tim Holt
 Richard Martin
 Noreen Nash
 Mauritz Hugo

References

External links

1952 films
American Western (genre) films
1952 Western (genre) films
RKO Pictures films
American black-and-white films
1950s English-language films
Films directed by Lesley Selander
1950s American films